Nature Food is a monthly peer-reviewed academic journal published by Nature Portfolio. It was established in 2020. The editor-in-chief is Anne Mullen.

Abstracting and indexing
The journal is abstracted and indexed in:

Science Citation Index Expanded
Scopus

According to the Journal Citation Reports, the journal has a 2021 impact factor of 20.430, ranking it 1st out of 143 journals in the category "Food Science & Technology".

References

External links

Nature Research academic journals
English-language journals
Food science journals
Publications established in 2020
Monthly journals
Online-only journals